The 2015 Beijing ePrix, formally the 2015 FIA Formula E SWUSP Beijing ePrix, was a Formula E motor race that was held on 24 October 2015 at the Beijing Olympic Green Circuit in Beijing, China. It was the second edition of the Beijing ePrix and the first race of the second season of the electrically powered racing car series. The race was dominated by Sébastien Buemi, who won starting from pole position. Since he also recorded the fastest lap, he became the first driver to score the maximum of 30 points from a single ePrix.

Report

Background
The Beijing Olympic Green Circuit was slightly modified in comparison to the previous year. The first chicane, previously Turns 3, 4 and 5, has been removed with the second chicane taking a tighter profile than last year. Drivers believe that the modified layout offers increased chances of overtaking.

Three drivers made their Formula E debut at this ePrix: Jacques Villeneuve (for Venturi), Robin Frijns (for Amlin Andretti) and Nathanaël Berthon (for Team Aguri).

Trulli did not start the Beijing ePrix because of a failure to submit their car for scrutineering. The team claimed that key components had been held up in customs. They will be able to resubmit their car for scrutineering for the second race.

The Fanboost was awarded to Nelson Piquet Jr., Sam Bird and Oliver Turvey.

Qualifying 
Sébastien Buemi, Jean-Éric Vergne, Nicolas Prost, Nick Heidfeld, and  Lucas di Grassi advanced to the pole position shoot-out. Di Grassi was first on track, however he had a big lock up into turn 1, and therefore was unable to set a competitive time. Heidfeld then set a solid but unspectacular time, before Prost went and lapped eight-tenths faster than the German. Then Vergne went out, only to have such a big lock up at turn 1 he went straight down the escape road, and gave up. That left Buemi to try and beat 2014's polesitter, and a poor middle sector made that look unlikely, but he then superbly negotiated the final sector to take pole position.

Race 
Buemi got a good start from pole, while Heidfeld was quick off the line, passing Prost round the outside of turn 1 in a similar move to the one he did in the previous year's race, before attacking race leader Buemi, unsuccessfully. Buemi then pulled away. On lap 2, prost locked up and ran deep, gifting Di Grassi third place. Simona de Silvestro then went straight into the wall on lap 3, bringing out a full course yellow. Meanwhile, a battle for 5th place at the time developed between Vergne and Bruno Senna, Loïc Duval and Sam Bird. Bird then lost out when he locked up and went down the escape road, but he caught back up by lap 11, and was in the ever changing battle again. Most people pitted at the end of lap 13, and a slow stop for Heidfeld dropped him from 2nd to 4th. Heidfeld did overtake Prost for a podium again. Crucially, both Dragon cars stayed out, giving them more usable energy at the end of the race. Jacques Villeneuve and António Félix da Costa collided, putting the Portuguese driver out of the race and bringing out a full course yellow, giving even more of the advantage to the Dragon cars who lost less time. Prost was more alert than Heidfeld off the restart and went through. His rear wing then broke on lap 20, although it made no difference to performance, but he was forced to retire. This left the Dragon cars with more usable energy, having already caught Heidfeld, to fight the Mahindra driver for the final spot on the podium. Jérôme d'Ambrosio locked up and was lucky to avoid his teammate. On the final lap, Heidfeld had to park the bus, and however hard the Frenchman tried, Duval simply couldn't find a way past the Mahindra in a battle that went right to the final corner. Buemi crossed the line to dominantly win, while Di Grassi, having been very quiet throughout the race, finished 2nd. Heidfeld just managed to keep his podium. The reigning champion  Nelson Piquet Jr. finished, albeit two laps down in the last classified position.

Classification

Qualifying

Notes:
 – Final grid position of top five qualifiers determined by Super Pole shootout.

Super Pole

Race

Notes:
 – Three points for pole position and two points for fastest lap.
 - Daniel Abt received a 10-seconds time penalty for an unsafe pit stop release.

Standings after the race

Drivers' Championship standings

Teams' Championship standings

 Notes: Only the top five positions are included for both sets of standings.

References

|- style="text-align:center"
|width="35%"|Previous race:2015 London ePrix2014–15 season
|width="30%"|FIA Formula E Championship2015–16 season
|width="35%"|Next race:2015 Putrajaya ePrix
|- style="text-align:center"
|width="35%"|Previous race:2014 Beijing ePrix
|width="30%"|Beijing ePrix
|width="35%"|Next race: -
|- style="text-align:center"

Beijing ePrix
Beijing ePrix
Beijing ePrix